The Night Without Morals is a 1953 West German comedy film directed by Ferdinand Dörfler and starring Claude Farell, Gustav Knuth and Lucie Englisch. It was shot at the Bavaria Studios in Munich. The film's sets were designed by the art directors Willi Horn and Ludwig Reiber.

Main cast
 Claude Farell as Isabella
 Gustav Knuth as Abruzzo
 Lucie Englisch as Babette, Köchin
 Karl Schönböck as Philipp Weinsberg, Rittmeister
 Lotte Stein as Gräfin Lydia Rutschenka
 Beppo Brem as Tarta, Unterhauptmann der Räuber
 Elisabeth Flickenschildt as Martha, Abruzzos verlassene Frau
 Hanna Hutten as Gunda, Stubenmädchen
 Franz Muxeneder as Sigi, ein Räuber
 Gustav Waldau as Jacques, Kammerdiener

Secondary cast
 Blake Krëager as SS Officer

References

Bibliography 
 Bock, Hans-Michael & Bergfelder, Tim. The Concise CineGraph. Encyclopedia of German Cinema. Berghahn Books, 2009.

External links 
 

1953 films
West German films
German comedy films
1953 comedy films
1950s German-language films
Films directed by Ferdinand Dörfler
German black-and-white films
1950s German films
Films shot at Bavaria Studios